The 1985 Sabah state election was held between Saturday, 20 April and Sunday, 21 April 1985. This was the fifth state election to take place. Parti Bersatu Sabah won 25 out 48 seats contested, thus forming government with its president Joseph Pairin Kitingan being sworn in as Chief Minister. This election is a milestone in Sabah political history as it marked the first time that a party not part of the nation's ruling coalition Barisan Nasional (BN) formed government. PBS took control of the state from the previous ruling government under Parti Berjaya—a partner of BN, which has been in power since 1976.

Results

Aftermath

Pairin, himself a former member of Party Berjaya, formed PBS barely 47 days before the elections. Opponents of PBS, namely, Harris Salleh of Berjaya, and Tun Mustapha of USNO were dissatisfied with the result. Tun Mustapha then sought to get sworn in as Chief Minister illegally, and this resulted in a court battle which ended in favour of Pairin.

The election resulted in riots around Sabah between March and May 1986. Bombings occurred in Kota Kinabalu, and arson in other towns. The rioters were trying to bring down Pairin from being the head of the state government.

In 1986 itself, another election was announced following defections by PBS assemblymen to USNO. PBS won again, this time with a two-thirds majority. PBS joined the Barisan Nasional coalition after this election, but later left the coalition in 1990.

References

Sabah state elections
Sabah